The 2013 Canoe Slalom World Cup was a series of five races in 5 canoeing and kayaking categories organized by the International Canoe Federation (ICF). It was the 26th edition. The team events were held as part of the world cup program for the first time in history, but no points were awarded for them.

Calendar 

The series opened with World Cup Race 1 in Cardiff, Wales (June 21–23) for the second year in a row and ended with the World Cup Final in Bratislava, Slovakia (August 23–25), also for the second consecutive year.

Final standings 

The winner of each race was awarded 60 points. Points for lower places differed from one category to another. Every participant was guaranteed at least 2 points for participation and 5 points for qualifying for the semifinal run. If two or more athletes or boats were equal on points, the ranking was determined by their positions in the World Cup Final.

Results

World Cup Race 1 

The opening race of the series took place at the Cardiff International White Water facility in Wales from 21 to 23 June. It featured the team events for the first time at a world cup meeting. The organizers experienced water pump problems during the C1 final which caused a lack of water on the course and a 30-minute delay of competition. Great Britain topped the medal table in the individual events with 2 golds, 1 silver and 1 bronze.

World Cup Race 2 

Augsburg Eiskanal hosted the second world cup race of the season from 28 to 30 June. France won 2 golds and 1 bronze in the individual events to top the medal table.

World Cup Race 3 

The third world cup race took place at the site of the 1992 Olympic race, the Segre Olympic Park in La Seu d'Urgell from 5 to 7 July. Slovenia won the medal table in the individual events with 2 golds and 1 bronze.

World Cup Race 4 

The penultimate world cup race took place in Tacen, Slovenia from 16 to 18 August. The organizers were forced to re-run the final races of the women's K1 event and the men's C2 event due to troubles with the water level. For the same reason the team events in these 2 disciplines have been cancelled. The women's C1 team event did not take place due to lack of participating teams. Slovenia won 2 golds and 2 bronzes in the individual events which was enough to win the medal table. Jessica Fox won both the K1 and the C1 event, becoming the first female paddler to win both events at one world cup race.

World Cup Final 

The world cup final took place in Bratislava, Slovakia from 23 to 25 August. The home paddlers won the individual medal table with 2 golds, 1 silver and 1 bronze. Michal Martikán made his first competitive appearance since the London Olympics and he won the C1 event. The women's C1 team event did not take place. Both teams which entered the competition (Germany and Great Britain) did not start.

References

External links 
 International Canoe Federation

Canoe Slalom World Cup
Canoe Slalom World Cup